The Q School is an amateur snooker competition which serves as the qualification process for the World Snooker Tour.

Overview

The Q School was established in an attempt to streamline the qualification process for the World Snooker Tour. A series of play-offs are run every year before the season. Players pay a fixed entry fee to enter the play-off events, and there is no prize money. Each player who wins a quarter-final game qualifies for a two-year tour card on the Main Tour.

Winners by event 
For each event, four winners which qualified for the World Snooker Tour are listed.

 Notes
 Michael Georgiou represented England in 2014, but switched to Cyprus in 2016.

Statistics
 Craig Steadman has qualified from Q School on a record 4 occasions. Paul Davison and Fraser Patrick have both qualified through the event on three occasions.
 Michael Georgiou, Jordan Brown, David Gilbert, Fan Zhengyi, Fergal O'Brien and Zhao Xintong are the six Q-School qualifiers to win a ranking event. Zhao is the only one to have won multiple ranking events. O'Brien, Brown and Gilbert had been professionals before qualifying through Q School.
 The youngest qualifier through Q School was Lei Peifan at 15, while Peter Lines was the oldest, qualifying at 51 in 2021.

References

 
Snooker amateur competitions
Snooker competitions in England
Snooker tours and series
Recurring sporting events established in 2011
2011 establishments in England